Ahmed Ameziane is a Moroccan politician. A member of the Popular Movement, he has served as Minister of Youth and Sports.

References

Government ministers of Morocco
Ministers for children, young people and families
Sports ministers
Living people
Year of birth missing (living people)